Acid anhydride hydrolases are a class of hydrolase enzymes that catalyze the hydrolysis of an acid anhydride bond. They are classified under EC number 3.6. One well known member of this class is GTPase.

See also
 List of EC numbers (EC 3)#EC 3.6: Act on acid anhydrides

References

External links

EC 3.6